The Grey House (Danish: Det Grå Hus) is a listed building in the Carlsberg area of Copenhagen, Denmark.

History

Winstrup's house
The oldest part of the building is a house built in 1875. The building was designed by Laurits Albert Winstrup.

Carlsberg ownership
It was acquired by Carl Jacobsen in connection with his foundation of the Ny Carlsberg Brewery. The new brewery's administration used the ground floor while the first and second floor contained a residence for a leading employee.

In 1901, Hack Kampmann altered the building and created an extension on its north side which doubled its floor area, adding a vestibule, offices and a laboratory.

In 1970, the building was once again expanded, this time with a laboratory wing to the west.

Architecture
The building is constructed in yellow brick with sandstone bands around the windows. The roof is clad in slate and zinc with flashings of copper and zinc. The facade is decorated with sandstone reliefs and there is a sandstone balustrade above the main entrance. Ny Carlsberg's trademark and Carl Jacobsen's motto, Semper ardens, are seen above the door.

The vestibule is lavishly decorated with stuccos.

Gallery

See also
 Ny Carlsberg Glyptotek

References

External links

 Carlsberg district (in Danish)
 Source

Carlsberg (district)
Office buildings in Copenhagen
Listed office buildings in Copenhagen
Hack Kampmann buildings
Art Nouveau architecture in Copenhagen
Art Nouveau commercial buildings